The Conference of Catholic Bishops of India or CCBI, is the national episcopal conference of the bishops of the Latin Church of the Catholic Church in India, functioning in accordance with canon 447. There are 132 Latin Catholic dioceses in the country, and 190 active and retired bishops are the members of the CCBI. This is the largest bishops' conference in Asia and the fourth largest in the world. The CCBI is a member of the Federation of Asian Bishops' Conferences.

The Conference of Catholic Bishops of India enables the Latin Catholic bishops of the country to exchange ideas and information, deliberate on the Church's broad concerns and take care of the pastoral needs of the faithful. The conference is to assist the bishops both in pastoral care and in evangelization, the twin duties of a bishop. One of the main purposes of the CCBI according to its statutes is "to promote that greater good which the Church offers humankind especially through forms and programmes of the apostolate which are adequately adapted to the circumstances of time and place."

Historical background

In 1944 a conference of Indian bishops known as Catholic Bishops' Conference of India (CBCI) was established. When the national episcopal conferences got the juridical and structural recognition during Vatican II, the CBCI began to reorganize itself with infrastructures such as national commissions, regional councils of bishops and national organizations working under its guidance and directives. The promulgation of the Latin 1983 Code of Canon Law in 1983 contributed to the debate about establishing a conference only for the Latin rite bishops. Pope John Paul II, after his visit to India in 1986, wrote an apostolic letter to the Indian bishops on 28 May 1987. An important text of which reads thus: "The bishops of each of the three rites have the right to establish their own episcopal bodies in accordance with their own ecclesiastical legislation. The CBCI which is an assembly of the bishops of India of the three rites is to continue for matters of common concern and of national and supra-ritual character. These areas are to be determined in the new statues of the CBCI".

In compliance with the pope's directive, the CBCI in its general meeting in April 1988 decided that all the three ritual churches could have their own episcopal bodies. Accordingly, the bishops of the Latin Church started their own episcopal conference in the same meeting and named it "Conference of Catholic Bishops of India – Latin Rite" (CCBI-LR). In January 1994, the Holy See approved its statutes. Hence, the Conference of Catholic Bishops of India is an organization having its legal foundation in canon law, which applies to the Catholic church of the Roman rite throughout the world. Therefore, according to canons 447–459, the CCBI is the central church body of the bishops in India and its purpose is to deliberate on matters of concern for the whole Latin church and encourage activities in accordance with the needs of the times. The members of the CCBI are: 1) The diocesan bishops, their coadjutors, and auxiliaries, 2) The administrators of the dioceses when the Episcopal See is vacant, 3) The retired bishops and, 4) those honorary bishops appointed by the Holy See or the bishops' conference for particular tasks.

The bishops' conference is headed by a president, who is overall in-charge and represents the conference, a vice president and a secretary general to assist him for a term of two years. The bishops' conference, in addition to plenary assemblies, has an executive committee to handle ordinary matters, the commissions and the secretariat.

Organizational structure

At first, an ad hoc office bearers body consisting of a president and vice president was elected and a small team of four bishops forming the executive committee assisted it. At its Third Plenary Assembly in Goa (1991) a full team of office bearers was elected and an executive committee consisting of the office bearers, all the metropolitans of the Latin ecclesiastical provinces and the chairpersons of CCBI commissions was constituted. The Holy See approved its statues on 13 January 1994. At the lapse of five years in 1999 and in the light of the Apostolos Suos, the statutes were revised and the Holy See permanently approved them on 3 December 2000 (Prot. 5242/00). The Conference of Catholic Bishops of India was registered under the Societies Registration Act XXI of 1860. Regd. No.S/19920 of 1 May 1989.

Executive committee

The executive committee acts as the Administrative Board. It meets at least once a year mainly to see that the decisions, resolutions and recommendations of the Conference are duly implemented. It is composed of:

 The office bearers of the conference (president, vice president and secretary general).
 The metropolitans (archbishops of Agra, Bangalore, Bhopal, Bombay, Calcutta, Cuttack-Bhubaneswar, Delhi, Gandhinagar, Goa and Daman, Guwahati, Hyderabad, Imphal, Madras-Mylapore, Madurai, Nagpur, Patna, Pondicherry-Cuddalore, Raipur, Ranchi, Shillong, Trivandrum, Verapoly and Vizhakapattanam).
 The chairmen of the CCBI commissions.

Plenary Assembly

The Bishops of the Latin Catholic Church in India are the members of the Plenary Assembly of the conference. The Ordinary Plenary Assembly of the conference is held every year. Extraordinary Plenary Assemblies are held according to the need decided by at least a two-thirds of the members of the executive committee.

At the Plenary Assembly the conference reviews the situation and assesses the progress of the Church in India, and in the light of its own purposes it decides on plans that may be needed and actions that may be envisaged.

The reports of the twelve commissions, regional bishops' councils are submitted every two years in the Plenary Assembly. While the report of the secretary general is published along with the Report of the Annual General Body Meeting of the CCBI, the Biennial Reports of the CCBI Commissions and regional bishops' councils are printed separately just before the meeting. Whereas the reports of the various proceedings of the annual Plenary Assembly and reports of the secretary general are published every year. The reports of the commissions normally find place in the agenda booklet of the Plenary Assembly or they are printed in a separate booklet.

Plenary Assemblies
1st PA: 14 April 1988, Kottayam on Various Topics
2nd PA: 6, 7, 16, 17 November 1989, Sacred Heart College, Shillong on Various Topics
3rd PA: 6–8 January 1991, Pilar, Goa on Evangelization in India
4th PA: 6 &14 January 1992, Ishvani Kendra, Pune on Various Topics
5th PA: 4–6 January 1993, St. Pius College, Bombay Catechism of the Catholic Church
6th PA: 3–4 March 1994 Holy Family Hospital, New Delhi Various topics
7th PA: 5–7 January 1995, Morning Star College, Barrackpore (Calcutta) 	Pro-Life
8th PA: 12 & 22 February 1996, St. Mary's Malankara Major Seminary, Trivandrum, Various Topics
9th PA: 9–12 January 1997, St. Joseph's Seminary, Mangalore on Inculturation
10th PA: 18–20 March 1998, Nav Sadhana, Varanasi on Various topics
11th PA: 6–10 January 1999, St. John's Regional Seminary, Hyderabad on The Bishop Servant of the Gospel of Christ for the Hope of the World
12th PA: 25 – 28 January 2000, St. Joseph's Engineering College, Chennai on The Priest and the third Christian Millennium
13th PA: 10–13 January 2001, Morning Star College, Barrackpore (Calcutta), Laity in a Participatory Church
14th PA: 26–28 February 2002, Trinity College, Jalandhar, CCBI at the Service of the Community
15th PA: 15–19 January 2003, St. Paul's Seminary, Tiruchirapalli, Sharing the Good News
16th PA: 10 January 2004, Mary Matha Major Seminary, Trichur, Recommendations from the Special Commission for Evangelization
17th PA: 4–8 March 2005, Social Development Centre, Ranchi on Family
18th PA: 11 February 2006, St. Peter's Pontifical Seminary, Bangalore, One day PA further reflection on CCBI service of the Dioceses
19th PA: 4–9 January 2007, St. Joseph's Pontifical Seminary, Carmelgiri, Alwaye on The Vocation and Role of the Laity in the Life and Mission of the Church
20th PA: 16 February 2008, Xavier Institute of Labour Relations, Jamshedpur on Various topics
21st PA: 12–18 February 2009, Pallotine Theology Centre (Prabhodhana Mysore) on The Word of God in the Life and Mission of the Church
22nd PA: 27 February 2010, Don Bosco Centre, Guwahati on Various topics
23rd PA: 6–12 January 2011 Sacred Heart Seminary, Chennai on Catechetical Renewal, Essential for a Vibrant Church in India
24th PA: 5 February 2012, St. John's National Academy of Health Sciences, Bangalore on Various Topics
25th PA: 5–10 February 2003 Shrine Retreat House, Vailankanni, Pastoral Plan for the Church in India
26th PA: 9 February 2014, Alphonsian Pastoral Institute, Palai, Various topics
27th PA: 3–9 February 2015 St. John's National Academy of Health Sciences, Bangalore, Liturgy and Life
28th PA: 6 March 2016 St. John's National Academy of Health Sciences, Bangalore on Various Topics
29th PA: 31 Jan - 8 Feb 2017, Pastoral Centre, Ashaniketan Campus, Bhopal, Promoting Love and Joy in Our Families
30th PA: 4 February 2018 St. John's National Academy of Health Sciences, Bangalore on Various Topics
31st PA: 7 to 14 January 2019 at Joe Animation Centre, Mahabalipuram, Chennai, Tamil Nadu on "Joy of the Gospel
32nd PA: 16 February 2020 at St. John's National Academy of Health Sciences, Bangalore on Various Topics
33rd PA: 2 to 12 February 2021 at Xavier University International Centre, Bhubaneswar, Odisha

CCBI Secretariats in India

CCBI CENTRE
CCBI Secretariat, P. B. No. 8490, Hutchins Road 2 Cross
Bangalore-560084, Karnataka, India
www.ccbi.in

The CCBI Centre is the Central Secretariat of the Conference of Catholic Bishops of India. The Deputy Secretary General operates from the CCBI Centre, Bangalore. The Secretariat coordinates the ministries of the 16 Commissions and 4 Departments of the CCBI, of which three of the Commission Executive Secretaries reside at the Centre along with the Deputy Secretary General.

The first CCBI Secretariat was in Goa in 1988, it was then shifted to Delhi in 1992. In Delhi it operated from the CCBI Secretariat, Pitampura, from 1992 to 1995 and from Archbishop's House Delhi from 1995 to 1996. In the year 1997 the CCBI established its own first separate Secretariat in Delhi, at 9–10, Bhai Vir Singh Marg, New Delhi 110001.

The CCBI Centre Bangalore was inaugurated on 14 September 2002 as the Secretariat for the CCBI Commissions for Bible, Catechetics and Liturgy. Later in the year 2003 the Deputy Secretary General shifted his office from Delhi to the Bangalore, Secretariat. The CCBI building at Delhi is currently used by Caritas India

SHANTI SADAN
CCBI Secretariat Extension
Benaulim, Goa 403716, India

Shanti Sadan is the CCBI Secretariat Extension in Benaulim, Goa, it was inaugurated on 6 January 2020. Three of the CCBI Commission Secretaries are operating from Shanti Sadan. The building was constructed by FABC in 2003 for the Commission for Evangelization. The FABC closed its office in Goa and the CCBI bought it on 16 December 2018. The CCBI renovated the building and constructed a chapel and conference hall.

SUVARTA KENDRA
CCBI Secretariat for Proclamation
Pachmarhi, Hosangabad-461881
Madhya Pradesh, India
Website: www.kjp2033.com

Suvarta Kendra is the CCBI Secretariat for Proclamation. The land and property belongs to the Allahabad diocese and the Allahabad diocese handed over the property to the CCBI to promote evangelization in the Church in India especially in the north and northeast India. The Suvarta Kendra as the Secretariat of the CCBI Commission for Proclamation was inaugurated in 2011.

BETHANIA
CCBI Secretariat for Youth
A-2, Central Green, NH-5
Faridabad-121001, Delhi, India

Bethania is the Secretariat of the CCBI Youth Commission and the ICYM and YCS/YSM also operate from Bethania. It was inaugurated on 13 September 2019. The property and building of Bethania belong to the Archdiocese of Delhi.

Pontifical Mission Organisations
PMO Secretariat, Post Box No. 4216
10, Ulsoor Road, Bangalore-560042, Karnataka, India
Website: www.pmoinindia.org

The Pontifical Mission Organisations (PMO) is the name given to a group of Catholic missionary societies that are under the canonical jurisdiction of the Bishop of Rome. In India PMO operates under the guidance and direction of the CCBI. The PMO organizations include: (1) The Society for the Propagation of the Faith, (2) The Society of St. Peter the Apostle, (3) Holy Childhood Association and (4) Missionary Union of Priests and Religious. Currently the National Director resides and operates from the PMO Secretariat.

Office Bearers of the CCBI
 President: Filipe Neri Ferrão, Archbishop of Goa and Damam 
 Vice President: George Antonysamy, Archbishop of Madras-Mylapore
 Secretary General: Anil Joseph Thomas Couto, Archbishop of Delhi
 Deputy Secretary General: Stephen Alathara, from Verapoly Archdiocese

Presidents of CCBI
 Archbishop Henry D’Souza: 1988–1990; 1991-1992
 Cardinal Simon Pimenta: 1993–1995; 1995-1997
 Archbishop Marianus Arokiasamy: 1997-1999
 Archbishop Henry D’Souza: 1999-2001
 Archbishop Telesphore Toppo: 2001-2004
 Cardinal Oswald Gracias: 2005-2010
 Cardinal Telesphore P. Toppo: 2011-2013
 Cardinal Oswald Gracias: 2013 –2019
 Archbishop Filipe Neri Ferrao 2019-

Vice-Presidents of CCBI
 Archbishop Leobard D’Souza	: 1988
 Archbishop Marianus Arockiasamy: 1991
 Archbishop Casimir Gnanadickam: 1993
 Archbishop Marianus Arockiasamy: 1994
 Bishop Patrick D’Souza: 1996
 Archbishop Telesphore P. Toppo: 1998-2002
 Bishop Valerian D’souza: 2002-2007
 Archbishop Vincent M. Concessao: 2007-2011
 Archbishop Filipe Neri Ferrão: 2011-2017
 Archbishop George Antonysamy: 2017 -

Secretary General of CCBI
 Archbishop Angelo Fernandes: 1989
 Bishop Joseph Rodericks: 1991
 Archbishop Ignatius Paul Pinto: 1994-1998
 Bishop Thomas Dabre: 1998-2005
 Archbishop Prakash Mallavarapu: 2005-2011
 Bishop Varghese Chakkalakal: 2011 - 2017
 Archbishop Anil Joseph Thomas Couto: 2017 -

Deputy Secretary Generals of CCBI
 Rev. Dr. Mario Saturnino Dias: 1989-1991
 Rev. Dr. Arulsamy: 1991-2002
 Rev. Dr. Simon Sebastian: 2002-2006
 Rev. Dr. Udumala Bala: 2006-2013
 Rev. Dr. Stephen Alathara: 2014-

CCBI Commissions and Chairmen

1. Commission for Boundary 
Chairman: Most Rev. Filipe Neri Ferrão, Archbishop of Goa and Daman 
Member: Most Rev. George Antonysamy, Archbishop of Madras-Mylapore
Member: Most Rev. Anil Joseph Thomas Couto, Archbishop of Delhi

2. Commission for Bible
Chairman: Most Rev. Antonysamy Peter Abir, Bishop of Sultanpet
Member: Most Rev. Joseph Raja Rao S.M.M., Bishop of Vijayawada
Member: Most Rev. John Rodrigues, Auxiliary Bishop of Bombay

3. Commission for Canon Law and Other Legislative Texts
Chairman: Most Rev. Derek Fernandes, Bishop of Karwar
Member: Most Rev. Cajetan Francis Osta, Bishop of Muzaffarpur
Member: Most Rev. Sebastian Thekethecheril, Bishop of Vijayapuram

4. Commission for Catechetics 
Chairman: Most Rev. Thomas Ignatius Macwan, Archbishop of Gandhinagar
Member: Most Rev. Jojo Anand, Bishop of Hazaribag
Member: Most Rev. Antonisamy Francis, Bishop of Kumbakonam

5. Commission for Ecology 
Chairman: Most Rev. Allwyn D'Silva, Auxiliary Bishop of Bombay
Member: Most Rev. Ivan Pereira, Bishop of Jammu-Srinagar
Member: Most Rev. Kishor Kumar Kujur, Bishop of Rourkela

6. Commission for Ecumenism
Chairman: Most Rev. Francis Serrao, SJ, Bishop of Shimoga
Member: Most Rev. Arulappan Amalraj, Bishop of Ootacamund
Member: Most Rev. Thomas Dabre, Bishop of Poona

7. Commission for Family
Chairman: Most Rev. Sebastian Kallupura, Co-adjutor Bishop of Patna
Member: Most Rev. Peter Paul Saldanha, Bishop of Mangalore
Member: Most Rev. Thomas Aquinas, Bishop of Coimbatore

8. Commission for Laity
Chairman: Most Rev. Eugene Joseph, Bishop of Varanasi
Member: Most Rev. Peter Machado, Archbishop of Bangalore
Member: Most Rev. Stephen Lepcha, Bishop of Darjeeling

9. Commission for Liturgy 
Chairman: Most Rev. Peter Paul Saldanha, Bishop of Mangalore
Member: Most Rev. Paul Toppo, Bishop of Raigarh
Member: Most Rev. Niranjan Sualsingh, Bishop of Sambalpur

10. Commission for Migrants
Chairman: Most Rev. Victor Henry Thakur, Archbishop of Raipur
Member: Most Rev. Elias Gonsalves, Bishop of Amravati
Member: Most Rev. Soundararaju Periyanayagam, SDB, Bishop of Vellore

11. Commission for Proclamation 
Chairman: Most Rev. Raphy Manjaly, Bishop of Allahabad
Member: Most Rev. George Palliparambil, SDB, Bishop of Miao
Member: Most Rev. Sebastianappan Singaroyan, Bishop of Salem

12. Commission for Small Christian Communities
Chairman: Most Rev. Ignatius Loyola Mascarenhas, Bishop of Simla
Member: Most Rev. Selvister Ponnumuthan, Bishop of Punalur
Member: Most Rev. Gerald John Mathias, Bishop of Lucknow

13. Commission for Theology and Doctrine
Chairman: Most Rev. Felix Toppo, SJ, Archbishop of Ranchi
Member: Most Rev. Albert D’Souza, Archbishop of Agra
Member: Most Rev. Lawrence Pius Dorairaj, Bishop of Dharmapuri

14. Commission for Vocations, Seminaries, Clergy and Religious
Chairman: Most Rev. Udumala Bala, Bishop of Warangal
Member: Most Rev. Vincent Aind, Bishop of Bagdogra
Member: Most Rev. Varghese Chakkalakal, Bishop of Calicut

15. Commission for Women
Chairman: Most Rev. Francis Kalist, Bishop of Meerut
Member: Most Rev. Binay Kandulna, Bishop of Khunti
Member: Most Rev. Gerald Isaac Lobo, Bishop of Udupi

16. Commission for Youth
Chairman: Most Rev. Nazarene Soosai, Bishop of Kottar
Member: Most Rev. Ignatius D’Souza, Bishop of Bareilly
Member: Most Rev. Henry D’Souza, Bishop of Bellary

Regions under CCBI

1. The AGRA REGIONAL BISHOPS’ COUNCIL (ARBC) consists of the Bishops of the ecclesiastical province of Agra.

(1) Agra Archdiocese, (2) Ajmer, (3) Allahabad, (4) Bareilly, (5) Jaipur, (6) Jhansi, (7) Lucknow, (8) Meerut, (9) Udaipur, (10) Varanasi.

Chairman: Most Rev. Albert D’Souza (Agra)

Secretary: Most Rev. Oswald Lewis (Jaipur)

2. The BENGAL REGIONAL BISHOPS’ COUNCIL (BRBC) consists of the Bishops of the ecclesiastical province of Calcutta.

(1) Calcutta Archdiocese, (2) Asansol, (3) Bagdogra, (4) Baruipur, (5) Darjeeling, (6) Jalpaiguri, (7) Krishnagar, (8) Raiganj.

Chairman: Most Rev. Thomas D’Souza (Calcutta)

Secretary: Most Rev. Clement Tirkey (Jalpaiguri)

3. The JHARKHAND REGIONAL BISHOPS’ COUNCIL consists of the Bishops of the ecclesiastical province of Ranchi.

(1) Ranchi Archdiocese, (2) Daltonganj, (3) Dumka, (4) Gumla, (5) Jamshedpur, (6) Khunti, (7) Port-Blair, (8) Simdega, (9) Hazaribag.

Chairman: Most Rev. Felix Toppo (Jamshedpur)
Secretary: Most Rev. Theodore Mascarenhas (Aux. Ranchi)

4. The BIHAR REGIONAL BISHOPS’ COUNCIL consists of the Bishops of the ecclesiastical province of Patna.

(1) Patna Archdiocese, (2) Bettiah, (3) Bhagalpur, (4) Buxar, (5) Muzaffarpur, (6) Purnea.

Chairman: Most Rev. William D’Souza (Patna)
Secretary: Most Rev. Sebastian Kallupura (Buxar)

5. The COUNCIL OF BISHOPS OF CHHATTISGARH (CBCG) consists of the Bishops of the ecclesiastical province of Raipur.

(1) Raipur Archdiocese, (2) Ambikapur, (3) Jashpur, (4) Raigarh.

Chairman: Most Rev. Victor Henry Thakur (Raipur)

Secretary: Most Rev. Paul Toppo (Raigarh)

6. The KARNATAKA REGIONAL CATHOLIC BISHOPS’ COUNCIL (KRCBC) comprises all the Bishops of the ecclesiastical province of Bangalore.

(1) Bangalore Archdiocese, (2) Bellary, (3) Belgaum, (4) Chikmagalur, (5) Gulbarga, (6) Karwar, (7) Mangalore, (8) Mysore, (9) Shimoga, (10) Udupi.

Chairman: Most Rev. Bernard Moras (Bangalore)

7. The KERALA REGIONAL LATIN CATHOLIC BISHOPS’ COUNCIL (KRLCBC) comprises all the Bishops of the ecclesiastical provinces of Verapoly and Trivandrum (Latin Rite).

(1) Verapoly Archdiocese, (2) Calicut, (3) Cochin, (4) Kannur, (5) Kottapuram, (6) Sultanpet, (7) Vijayapuram.

(1) Trivandrum Archdiocese, (2) Alleppey, (3) Neyyatinkara, (4) Punalur, (5) Quilon.

Chairman: Most Rev. Maria Kalist Soosa Pakiam (Trivandrum)

Secretary: Most Rev. Varghese Chakkalakal (Calicut)

8. The COUNCIL OF BISHOPS OF MADHYA PRADESH (CBMP) consists of the Bishops of the ecclesiastical province of Bhopal.

(1) Bhopal Archdiocese, (2) Gwalior, (3) Indore, (4) Jabalpur, (5) Jhabua, (6) Khandwa

Chairman: Most Rev. Leo Cornelio (Bhopal)

Secretary: Most Rev. Chacko Thottumarickal (Indore)

9. The REGIONAL BISHOPS’ COUNCIL OF THE NORTH consists of the Bishops of the ecclesiastical province of Delhi.

(1) Delhi Archdiocese, (2) Jammu-Srinagar, (3) Jalandhar, (4) Simla-Chandigarh.

Chairman: Most Rev. Anil Joseph Thomas Couto (Delhi)

Secretary: Most Rev. Franco Mulakkal (Jalandhar)

10. The NORTH EASTERN REGIONAL BISHOPS’ COUNCIL consists of the Bishops of the ecclesiastical provinces of Shillong, Guwahati and Imphal.

(1) Shillong Archdiocese, (2) Agartala, (3) Aizawl, (4) Jowai, (5) Nongstoin, (6) Tura.

(1) Guwahati Archdiocese, (2) Bongaigaon, (3) Dibrugarh, (4) Diphu, (5) Itanagar, (6) Miao, (7) Tezpur.

(1) Imphal Archdiocese, (2) Kohima.

Chairman: Most Rev. Dominic Jala, SDB (Shillong)

Secretary: Most Rev. John Thomas Kattrukudiyil (Itanagar)

11. The ORISSA BISHOPS’ REGIONAL COUNCIL (OBRC) consists of the Bishops of the ecclesiastical province of Cuttack-Bhubaneshwar.

(1) Cuttack- Bhubaneswar Archdiocese, (2) Balasore, (3) Berhampur, (4) Rourkela, (5) Sambalpur.

Chairman: Most Rev. John Barwa, SVD (Cuttack-Bhubaneshwar)

Secretary: Most Rev. Simon Kaipuram, CM (Balasore)

12. The TAMILNADU BISHOPS’ COUNCIL (TNBC) comprises all the Bishops of ecclesiastical provinces of Madras-Mylapore, Madurai, Pondicherry-Cuddalore.

1) Madras-Mylapore Archdiocese, (2) Chingleput, (3) Coimbatore, (4) Ootacamund, (5) Vellore.

(1) Madurai Archdiocese, (2) Dindigul, (3) Kottar, (4) Kuzhithurai, (5) Palayamkottai, (6) Sivagangai, (7) Tiruchirappalli, (8) Tuticorin.

(1) Pondicherry-Cuddalore Archdiocese, (2) Dharmapuri, (3) Kumbakonam, (4) Salem, (5) Thanjavur.

Chairman: Most Rev. Peter Remigius (Kottar)

Secretary: Most Rev. J. Susaimanickam (Sivagangai)

13. The TELUGU CATHOLIC BISHOPS’ COUNCIL (TCBC) comprises all the Bishops of the ecclesiastical provinces of Hyderabad and Visakhapatnam

(1) Hyderabad Archdiocese, (2) Cuddapah, (3) Khammam, (4) Kurnool, (5) Nalgonda, (6) Warangal.

(1) Visakhapatnam Archdiocese, (2) Eluru, (3) Guntur, (4) Nellore, (5) Srikakulam, (6) Vijayawada.

Chairman: Most Rev. Thumma Bala (Hyderabad)

Secretary: Most Rev. Anthony Poola (Kurnool)

14. The WESTERN REGIONAL BISHOPS’ COUNCIL comprises all the Bishops of the ecclesiastical provinces of Bombay, Nagpur, Goa and Daman, Gandhinagar.

(1) Bombay Archdiocese, (2) Nashik, (3) Poona, (4) Vasai.

(1) Nagpur Archdiocese, (2) Amravati, (3) Aurangabad

(1) Goa and Daman Archdiocese, (2) Sindhudurg.

(1) Gandhinagar Archdiocese, (2) Ahmedabad, (3) Baroda

Chairman: Most Rev. Felix Anthony Machado (Vasai)

Secretary: Most Rev. Dominic Savio Fernandes (Bombay)

References

External links

India
Catholic Church in India